Desiree Rose Marie Scott (born 31 July 1987) is a Canadian soccer player who plays as a midfielder for National Women's Soccer League club Kansas City Current and the Canadian national team. Nicknamed "the destroyer", she won gold at the 2020 Olympics in Tokyo, which was her third Olympic medal following bronze medals in 2012 in London and in 2016 in Rio.

Early life
Scott was born and raised in Winnipeg, Manitoba. Her father was born in Kingston, Jamaica, while her mother was also born in Winnipeg. She grew up participating in soccer, volleyball, track and field, and basketball. She began playing soccer at the age of eight.

University career
From 2005 to 2009, Scott played Canadian Interuniversity Sport (CIS) soccer for the University of Manitoba. During her tenure with the Bisons, she was named a first team CIS All-Canadian in 2009. She earned Canada West All-Star honours twice and won the Canada West Rookie of the Year award in 2005.

Club career

Early career
Scott played for the Vancouver Whitecaps FC from 2006 to 2012. In 2006, Scott appeared in five matches for the Caps (450 minutes), contributing to the team winning their second W-League title that season.

In 2010, she appeared in seven games and two playoff games for the team contributing one goal and one assist. Scott helped carry the Whitecaps to the W-League Championship where they eventually fell to Buffalo in the final.

FC Kansas City
In 2013, as part of the NWSL Player Allocation, Scott joined FC Kansas City in the new National Women's Soccer League. Notts County Ladies of the English FA WSL announced that they had signed Scott in January 2014, but she was subsequently included on the list of Canadian players allocated to the NWSL for 2014.

Notts County

On 27 February 2014, after more than a month of speculation and legal delays, Scott was officially signed by Notts County of the FA WSL. She missed the first half of the 2015 season while preparing for the World Cup with Canada, but returned in time for the 2015 FA Women's Cup Final at Wembley Stadium, which County lost 1–0 to Chelsea. She left the club in February 2016 after making 20 league appearances.

Return to FC Kansas City
On 8 February 2016, it was announced that Scott would play for FC Kansas City for the 2016 season of the National Women's Soccer League via the NWSL Player Allocation.

Utah Royals FC
On 15 February 2018 Canada Soccer announced that Scott would play for the Utah Royals FC during the 2018 season of the National Women's Soccer League via the NWSL Player Allocation. She opted out of play during the 2020 NWSL Challenge Cup and the NWSL Fall Series.

Kansas City Current 
Utah Royals FC folded in December 2020 and her playing rights were transferred to Kansas City NWSL.

International career
Scott has previously represented Canada on the U-16 and U-19 youth teams. After being called up to the senior squad by Carolina Morace, she debuted at the 2010 Cyprus Cup and participated in her first FIFA Women's World Cup at the 2011 event, making two substitute appearances. Under coach John Herdman, Scott became a regular pick and won a gold medal at the 2011 Pan American Games.

At the 2012 London Olympics, Scott won praise for her performances in the defensive midfield role, drawing comparison to the male player Edgar Davids. She had a major contribution for the team in the bronze medal game, clearing a ball off the line in defence of the goal to keep the score even at zero. Upon return to her native Winnipeg, Scott was serenaded with chants of her name and outbursts of song consisting of the Canadian national anthem at the Winnipeg airport. Scott took note of the welcome with pride saying that "I'm a very emotional person. To come home and hear my name being screamed... I'm holding back tears right now."

On 25 May 2019 she was named to the roster for the 2019 FIFA Women's World Cup.

Coaching career
Scott is an assistant coach at her alma mater, University of Manitoba.  She was an assistant coach for the West Kildonan Collegiate from 2003 until 2005. She also coached at the South End United Soccer Academy, and ran camps for kids while playing with the Vancouver Whitecaps and the Canadian women's national team. Scott has also run soccer clinics and camps, and was presenter and instructor for a number of different high school clubs in Winnipeg.

Scott has been an ambassador for the Homeless World Cup since 2014. She is also an athlete ambassador for KidSport Winnipeg, a charity that aims to remove the financial barriers to playing sport, and runs an annual soccer camp for girls on behalf of KidSport Winnipeg.

Honours
Canada
 Summer Olympics: 2021; bronze medal: 2012, 2016
 Pan American Games: 2011
Individual
Canada West Hall of Fame Inductee: 2019

See also
 List of women's footballers with 100 or more caps

References

External links

 

Vancouver Whitecaps bio
FC Kansas City player profile
Homeless World Cup Ambassador Profile
KidSport Winnipeg

1987 births
Living people
Black Canadian women's soccer players
Canadian sportspeople of Jamaican descent
Women's association football midfielders
Canadian expatriate women's soccer players
Canadian women's soccer players
Canada women's international soccer players
Expatriate women's soccer players in the United States
2011 FIFA Women's World Cup players
2015 FIFA Women's World Cup players
Footballers at the 2011 Pan American Games
Footballers at the 2012 Summer Olympics
Manitoba Bisons soccer players
National Women's Soccer League players
Olympic soccer players of Canada
Olympic medalists in football
Olympic bronze medalists for Canada
FC Kansas City players
Medalists at the 2012 Summer Olympics
Medalists at the 2016 Summer Olympics
Soccer players from Winnipeg
Vancouver Whitecaps FC (women) players
Notts County L.F.C. players
Women's Super League players
Expatriate women's footballers in England
Pan American Games gold medalists for Canada
FIFA Century Club
Footballers at the 2016 Summer Olympics
Pan American Games medalists in football
Utah Royals FC players
Canadian expatriate sportspeople in England
2019 FIFA Women's World Cup players
Medalists at the 2011 Pan American Games
Kansas City Current players
Footballers at the 2020 Summer Olympics
Medalists at the 2020 Summer Olympics
Olympic gold medalists for Canada